George Cyril Colmore (1885–1937) was an English aviator and the first Royal Naval Air Service officer to gain a Royal Aero Club Aviators Licence.

Military career
Colmore was born at Hathern, Leicestershire on 14 September 1885 and in 1901 he enrolled, aged 15, as an Officer Cadet at the Thames Nautical Training College (also known as HMS Worcester) in Dartford, Kent. In 1910, at his own expense, he joined the Royal Aero Club and learned to fly at the Royal Naval Flying School, Eastchurch. On 21 June 1910 he received Aviators Certificate No. 15 flying a Short biplane. Following his success the RAeC approached the Admiralty offering to train further naval aviators.

In 1917 Colmore was promoted Squadron Commander in command of the Wormwood Scrubs Royal Naval Air Station.

Family
Colmore married Phyllis Isobel Fellowes (died 1963), daughter of the late Captain Peregrine Fellowes on 25 January 1911 at St Peter's Church, South Kensington although the couple divorced in May 1921 on grounds of adultery; they had two children.

References

1880s births
1937 deaths
Military personnel from Leicestershire
People from the Borough of Charnwood
People from Cirencester
English aviators
Aviation pioneers
Royal Air Force personnel of World War I
Royal Naval Air Service aviators
Royal Air Force officers